John George Macleod (8 May 1915 in Kirkhill – 4 April 2006 in Edinburgh) was a Scottish doctor of medicine and an author of medical textbooks.

Family
Macleod was the elder brother of Professor Dr Anna MacGillivray Macleod, the world famous professor of Brewing at Heriot-Watt University in Edinburgh. His younger brother was Dr Alasdair MacGillivray Macleod, a general practitioner in Linlithgow. He was the son of Margaret Ingram Sangster, MA, and Rev. Alasdair MacGillivray Macleod, who both graduated in 1914 at Aberdeen University. He was  the grandson of Rev. George Macleod of Garrabost, Isle of Lewis. He was second cousin to the Right Hon. Iain Norman Macleod, who served as Chancellor of the Exchequer in 1970. The branch of the Macleods of Pabbay and Uig belongs to the Lewis family MacLeod. 

On 21 December 1942, John George Macleod married Nancie Elizabeth Clark. Their issue are two sons, Peter John Macleod, married Geraldine Finlay, who both died in 2022 and Keith Roderick Macleod, who died in 2010 and married Yvonne Ann Hay. They also had one daughter, Gillian Lesley Macleod, who is alive (2023)  and lives in Wadhurst, East Sussex, married since 1968 to Gerard Lemmens.

Career
Macleod was educated at George Watson's College and studied medicine at the University of Edinburgh, where he graduated in 1938. During the Second World War, from 1939 to 1945, he was a major in the army at the Royal Army Medical Corps. In 1941, he obtained a post at the University of Edinburgh and, in 1947, was asked to become a member of the Royal College of Physicians of Edinburgh. In 1950, he became a consultant physician at Edinburgh's Western General Hospital.

In 1964, Macleod wrote the medical handbook Clinical Examination (later renamed Macleod's Clinical Examination), which is still (in 2023) in print in its 19th Edition and has sold over a million copies. In 1964, the physician Sir Stanley Davidson offered him the opportunity to update Davidson's Principles and Practice of Medicine, which sold more than two million copies worldwide and of which Macleod contributed to six editions. These two textbooks played a crucial part in keeping Edinburgh on the world map of medicine and were translated into many languages such as Japanese and Russian. In 1971, he was appointed vice-chairman of the University Department of Medicine of the Western General Hospital. He died in Edinburgh in April 2006, aged 90.

Personal note
He was interested in art and gave lectures on Art in Medicine with slides he had collected. He also was an enthusiastic supporter of the Traverse Theatre, and a keen gardener and garden designer.
During State visits Macleod sometimes was the duty physician at Holyrood Palace and on one occasion received a gift from the French president Giscard D'Estaing.

References

 The Macleods – The Genealogy of a Clan, Section Four by Alick Morrison, M.A., by Associated Clan Macleod Societies, Edinburgh, 1974
 The MacLeods – The Genealogy of a Clan, Section Four by The Late Major Loudoun Hector Davenport MacLeod, RM, 1988

1915 births
2006 deaths
People educated at George Watson's College
20th-century Scottish medical doctors
Scottish medical writers
Alumni of the University of Edinburgh
British Army personnel of World War II
Royal Army Medical Corps officers